Davor Šuker (born 1 January 1968) is a Croatian football administrator and former footballer who played as a striker. He served as president of the Croatian Football Federation from 2012 to 2021. He began his footballing career in his hometown for local first division team NK Osijek as a 16-year-old. During his final season with the club, he became the league's top goal scorer. He made the move to sign for Dinamo Zagreb in 1989. The Croatian War of Independence halted a promising season for the 21-year-old, eventually resulting in Šuker's move to Spanish club Sevilla in 1991.

In La Liga, Šuker was highly regarded, showing consistent form with Sevilla and being consecutively amongst the division's top goal scorers. He signed with Real Madrid five years later, and was again amongst the league's top scorers. While at the Santiago Bernabéu, he helped Madrid claim the Liga and UEFA Champions League titles as well. A move to Arsenal saw him distinguish himself throughout their run to the UEFA Cup final of 2000. He then had a spell with West Ham United, then closed his career playing for German side 1860 Munich. The crowning moment of Šuker's career was the 1998 FIFA World Cup in France, where he won the Golden Boot by scoring six goals in seven matches. He also won the Silver Ball as the second-best player of tournament, behind Ronaldo. His goal-scoring feats proved instrumental in the Croatians winning the bronze medal in their debut World Cup. Croatia did not lose a single match which Šuker scored in prior to their semi-final loss to eventual champions France.

Named as Croatia's Golden Player for the UEFA 2003 Jubilee anniversary, he came third in the FIFA World Player of the Year awards in 1998. He is also on the FIFA 100 list of great footballers, as the only Croatian on such. Šuker is also Croatia's all-time top scorer with 45 goals altogether. He is generally regarded as the greatest Croatian striker of all time.

Under his highly controversial leadership as the president of Croatian Football Federation, Croatia reached runner-up at the 2018 FIFA World Cup, the highest achievement Croatia ever made since their independence in 1992 and twenty years since their third-place finish.

Club career

Early career
Šuker began playing football in his home town of Osijek with the club NK Osijek in 1984. In 1989, he moved to Dinamo Zagreb, where during the following two seasons he scored 34 goals in 60 Yugoslav First League matches. Šuker made such an impression that he received his first call-up to the Yugoslavia national team. His play also attracted several clubs, including Spanish club Sevilla, which he joined in 1991.

Sevilla
Šuker made his Primera División debut for Sevilla on 17 November 1991, coming off the substitutes' bench as a last-minute substitute in Sevilla's 1–1 away draw at Espanyol. In the following match, at home against Real Sociedad, he made his first start and went on to score two goals in a 2–2 draw. He finished his first season at the club with 6 goals in 22 appearances. During Sevilla's first match of the next season away at Albacete, Šuker scored his first Primera hat-trick, which led a 4–3 victory. He improved his tally from the prior season with 13 goals in 33 matches.

In the 1993–94 season, Šuker was the second-highest scorer in the league with 24 goals to Barcelona's Romário. He made a total of 34 Primera appearances that season and also scored five braces and one hat-trick. Šuker played with Argentine legend Diego Maradona at the club within the 1992–93 season. During this and the next season with Sevilla, he scored a total of 33 goals in 64 appearances in the Spanish Primera.

Real Madrid
Šuker went on to move to Real Madrid. This transfer came prior to the start of the 1996–97 season. With Los Galacticos, his goalscoring potency continued as he scored 24 goals in 38 appearances. Šuker ended up as the third-best scorer within the league, behind Barcelona's Ronaldo and Real Betis's Alfonso. During that season, he scored three hat-tricks in the Primera seeing Madrid to lift the league title. Along with Raúl and Predrag Mijatović, he formed a dangerous trio that struck fear in the opposing defenses to assure eventual acclaim for the club.

Šuker was again successful with Real Madrid in the following season, which won the 1997–98 UEFA Champions League. In the Primera, Šuker scored 10 goals in 29 appearances. Within the 1998–99 season, his presence at Real Madrid was reduced despite the fact he performed well at that summer's World Cup. This was seen as he made only 19 Primera appearances, scoring 4 goals as a whole. By that season's end, he opted to leave the club. His decision to leave also marked the close of his eight-season-long spell in the Spanish Primera, where he scored 114 goals in 239 total appearances.

Arsenal
Šuker joined FA Premier League club Arsenal for the 1999–2000 season. He made his league debut on 22 August 1999 in a 2–1 defeat to Manchester United at Highbury, coming on as a substitute for the final 15 minutes. He played another two matches as a substitute before making his first start in Arsenal's 3–1 home victory over Aston Villa, where he scored a brace, his first two goals in the Premier League. With Arsenal, he played in the 2000 UEFA Cup Final as an extra-time substitute, Šuker missed his penalty as Arsenal lost to Turkish side Galatasaray on penalties.

Šuker also scored once in the League Cup against Middlesbrough and twice in the UEFA Champions League against AIK (once at home and once away). He scored 8 league goals (including 3 braces) in 22 Premiership appearances with Arsenal.

West Ham United
At West Ham United, Šuker never managed to find his place in the first team for a long period and only made 11 Premiership appearances for the club throughout the season, scoring twice against Manchester United and Sunderland. He also scored once in the League Cup against Blackburn Rovers. His career in England ended with the end of that season, where he joined German side 1860 Munich for the 2001–02 season.

1860 Munich
At 1860 Munich, Šuker made his Bundesliga debut, playing all 90 minutes in the club's 1–0 home victory over Energie Cottbus on 1 December 2001. His first goal for 1860 came in their first match after the winter break, a headed effort which completed a 3–0 home victory over 1. FC Köln. His highlight of the season came during the final league match in a 4–2 away victory over Borussia Mönchengladbach, where he scored a brace. He finished his first season in the Bundesliga with 4 goals in 14 appearances.

In the 2002–03 season, Šuker scored in 1860 Munich's 3–1 home victory over Arminia Bielefeld on 2 November 2002. While playing with 1860 in the Bundesliga, he scored 5 goals in 25 appearances. He also made five appearances in the DFB-Pokal, scoring three goals.

International career
Šuker's eye for goals was duly illustrated in his feats at youth level. He finished as the second highest scorer as he netted six goals at the 1987 World Youth Championships in Chile. The Yugoslavians also set a Championship record with 22 goals scored altogether. Yugoslavia went on to win the title with a generation of future talents. Some of these players went on to represent Croatia such as Robert Prosinečki, Zvonimir Boban and Igor Štimac.

Šuker again played for Yugoslavia in the 1988 Seoul Summer Olympic games. Those appearances came in group stage matches against Brazil and Nigeria. In two years time, he featured in the UEFA Under-21 Championship. He scored four goals in five matches as Yugoslavia won their group stage. Šuker also struck the only goal in the second leg of his side's 3–0 quarter-final victory on aggregate against Bulgaria. He scored once again against Italy. In the final against Soviet Union he scored one goal in the first leg. In all he tallied a sum of seven goals throughout the Championships winning the Golden Boot. Yugoslavia went on to finish as runners up with Šuker also being named as the Golden Player of the Tournament.

Senior team
In 1990, Šuker was named to the Yugoslavia national team's 22-man squad for the 1990 FIFA World Cup finals in Italy. However, he did not make an appearance at the tournament.

On 22 December 1990, Šuker made his debut for the newly established Croatia national team in a friendly against Romania. In 1991, he won his only two caps for Yugoslavia at senior level: on 27 February 1991 against Turkey, and on 16 May 1991 against the Faroe Islands. In the latter match, Šuker scored his first senior international goal. This feat was noted given Croatia was not registered with FIFA nor UEFA at that point.

Šuker's second and the first official match for Croatia came in a friendly against Mexico in 1992 where he scored a brace in a 3–0 victory. He then led Croatia to their first major international tournament, UEFA Euro 1996, with a then-record 12 goals in 10 matches during the qualifying stages. During the Euro 1996 final stages in England, he scored three goals in four matches, including two in the 3–0 group stage win over defending champions Denmark. It was in this match he set up the final score with an unforgettable looping shot over Danish goalkeeper Peter Schmeichel, still remembered as one of the greatest goals in UEFA European Championship history. Šuker's feats during the tournament saw him named to the Team of the Tournament.

Šuker then went on to see Croatia qualify for their first FIFA World Cup after scoring five goals in nine matches during the qualifying stages for the 1998 finals in France. In the tournament proper, he scored six goals in seven matches, scoring in every match Croatia scored. These included goals in 1–0 victories over Japan in the group stage and Romania in the round of 16. In the quarter-finals against Germany, Šuker was fouled by Christian Wörns who received a straight red card. Šuker scored the final goal in a 3–0 victory. He also brought the team to the doorstep of the final by scoring the opener in the semi-final against France. Lilian Thuram took the match back for the hosts with his only two international goals to give France a 2–1 victory and a place in the final.

In the third-place play-off, Šuker scored the match-winner in a 2–1 victory against the Netherlands, leading Croatia to a sensational third-place finish in their first World Cup appearance since becoming an independent nation. Šuker won the Golden Boot as the tournament's top scorer, as well as the Silver Ball as the World Cup's second-best player, behind Ronaldo of Brazil.

After the 1998 World Cup, Šuker featured for Croatia in their unfruitful run to qualify for the Euro 2000. Šuker was though noted in endeavouring to keep Croatia's hopes alive when he scored a 94th-minute winner against the Republic of Ireland at Maksimir Stadium in Zagreb. The win ensured Croatia would have a strong chance of still qualifying for the tournament. The Croatians would miss out on such in their final qualifier, a 2–2 draw at home to Yugoslavia. Šuker did score a late disallowed goal which, if stood, would have assured Croatia's qualification. He finished with four goals in seven matches during the campaign.

Šuker was also part of the Croatian team at the 2002 World Cup finals in South Korea and Japan. However, he only played 63 minutes in the tournament, in a 1–0 defeat to Mexico in Croatia's opening match. After Croatia's elimination, Šuker announced his retirement from international football.

Šuker won a total of 71 international caps during his senior career, 2 for Yugoslavia and 69 for Croatia. The forward scored 46 international goals in total. With 45 goals, he is Croatia's all-time leading goal-scorer. His 12 goals during the campaign for Euro 1996 was a record that stood for over 10 years—Northern Ireland's David Healy broke his record in 2007 after scoring 13 goals during Euro 2008 qualifying.

Post-retirement

Šuker established his own school of football entitled the Davor Šuker Soccer Academy, with training camps located in Zagreb and several other Croatian cities. The concept for this academy originated near the end of his playing days.

Controversies
In 1996, in the company of two well-known criminals, Šuker posed for a picture at the grave of Croatian fascist dictator and genocide perpetrator, Poglavnik Ante Pavelić.

In 2011, Šuker was fined for stealing antique coins left over by another passenger on an airplane. Instead of reporting his findings and handing the coins in, he decided to give them to his girlfriend, who tried to sell them.

In 2015, Croatian Journalists' Association (HND) accused Šuker of preventing freedom of information and for physically blocking journalists from reporting and doing their work.

Career statistics

Club

International

Scores and results list Yugoslavia's and Croatia's goal tally first, score column indicates score after each Šuker goal.

Honours
Real Madrid
 La Liga: 1996–97
 Supercopa de España: 1997
 UEFA Champions League: 1997–98
 Intercontinental Cup: 1998

Arsenal
 UEFA Cup runner-up: 1999–2000

Yugoslavia Youth
 FIFA World Youth Championship: 1987
 UEFA European Under-21 Championship runner-up: 1990

Croatia
 FIFA World Cup third place: 1998

Individual
 1998 FIFA World Cup: Golden Boot
 1998 FIFA World Cup: Silver Ball
 1998 FIFA World Cup: All-Star Team
 Onze de Bronze: 1998
 Ballon d'Or runner-up: 1998
 FIFA World Player of the Year Bronze Award: 1998
 1987 FIFA World Youth Championship: Silver Shoe
 Yugoslav First League Top Goal Scorer: 1988-89
 UEFA European Under-21 Championship 1990: Golden Player
 UEFA European Under-21 Championship 1990: Golden Boot
 UEFA Euro Team of the Tournament: 1996
 ESM Team of the Year: 1996–97
 Croatian Footballer of the Year: 1992, 1994, 1995, 1996, 1997, 1998
Croatian Team of the Year: 1999, 2000
 Franjo Bučar State Award for Sport: 1998
 Croatian Sportsman of the year: 1998
 World Soccer 100 Greatest Players of the 20th Century: 1999
 UEFA Jubilee Awards Croatia's Golden Player: 2004
 FIFA 100: 2004
Honoree of Osijek: 2008
Vecernji list Croatian Player of the Century
 All-time top scorer of the Croatian national team

Orders
 Order of Danica Hrvatska with face of Franjo Bučar: 1995
 Order of the Croatian Trefoil: 1998
  Order of Duke Trpimir with Ribbon and Star: 2018

See also
 List of top international men's football goalscorers by country

References

External links
 

 
 What happened to Davor Šuker? at Realmadridnews.com
 
 

1968 births
Living people
Sportspeople from Osijek
Association football forwards
Yugoslav footballers
Yugoslavia international footballers
Olympic footballers of Yugoslavia
Footballers at the 1988 Summer Olympics
Croatian footballers
Croatia international footballers
1990 FIFA World Cup players
UEFA Euro 1996 players
1998 FIFA World Cup players
2002 FIFA World Cup players
FIFA 100
UEFA Golden Players
Dual internationalists (football)
NK Osijek players
GNK Dinamo Zagreb players
Sevilla FC players
Real Madrid CF players
Arsenal F.C. players
West Ham United F.C. players
TSV 1860 Munich players
Yugoslav First League players
La Liga players
Premier League players
Bundesliga players
UEFA Champions League winning players
Croatian expatriate footballers
Expatriate footballers in Spain
Croatian expatriate sportspeople in Spain
Expatriate footballers in England
Croatian expatriate sportspeople in England
Expatriate footballers in Germany
Croatian expatriate sportspeople in Germany
Presidents of the Croatian Football Federation
Members of the UEFA Executive Committee
Franjo Bučar Award winners